M'hamed Benguettaf ( – 5 January 2014)  was an Algerian actor and playwright.

M'hamed Benguettaf died following a long illness on 5 January 2014, aged 75, in his hometown of Algiers. He was buried in El Alia Cemetery.

References

1930s births
2014 deaths
People from Algiers
Algerian male film actors
Algerian male television actors
Algerian male stage actors
Algerian dramatists and playwrights
20th-century dramatists and playwrights
21st-century Algerian people